Jeffrey Paul Bihlman, aka Jabo (Jay-bo), is an American guitarist, singer, songwriter and producer. He is the lead guitarist of the Grinder Blues band. Bihlman received an Emmy Award along with his band, The Bihlman Bros.

Early life and education 
Bihlman was born in Hammond, Indiana. He is a graduate in Psychology from Manchester University, he is a graduate as well from Musicians Institute (GIT).

Career 
In 1997, Bihlman formed the rock band The Bihlman Bros. along with his brother Scot Bihlman, where he performed as the lead singer and guitarist until the split of the band in 2018. The band has toured the US and Europe, and performed at The Tweeter Center, the Van Andel Arena, Interlochen Center for the Arts, and the White House. In 2009, the band wrote and performed songs for the film Love N' Dancing.

In the late 1990s, he was the bandleader for Son Seals. Bihlman worked with Son Seals on the album Lettin' Go, which won the W.C. Handy Award. 

In 2014, Bihlman formed the Grinder Blues band with his brother Scot and King's X frontman Doug Pinnick, he is currently the lead guitarist for the band. The band has released two studio albums, Grinder Blues (2014) and El Dos (2021).

Bihlman is a former instructor at The National Guitar Workshop, WorkshopLive, and Interlochen Center for the Arts.

Selected discography

Albums 
With The Bihlman Bros:
 Day By Day — 1998
 Sweet Tooth — 2000
 American Son — 2003
 What U Want — 2009
With Son Seals
 Lettin' Go — 2000
With Grinder Blues:
 Grinder Blues — 2014
 El Dos — 2021, The album ranked at #17 among top 20 blues/rock albums.

Published works

References

External links 
 Official website
 

Living people
Guitarists from Indiana
American male singers
American male songwriters
People from Hammond, Indiana
Year of birth missing (living people)
Singers from Indiana
Songwriters from Indiana
Manchester University (Indiana) alumni